Turramurra railway station is located on the North Shore line, serving the Sydney suburb of Turramurra. It is served by Sydney Trains T1 North Shore line services.

History
Turramurra station opened on 1 January 1890 as Eastern Road when the North Shore line opened from Hornsby to St Leonards. It was renamed Turramurra on 30 August 1890. The present island platform and station building were completed in 1900.

In 1977, a precast concrete footbridge was installed. This was replaced in 2008 by a new footbridge and lift.

Platforms and services

Transport links
Transdev NSW operate six routes via Turramurra station:

Stand A:
573: to Fox Valley Loop via Warrawee Valley, Sydney Adventist Hospital, and then returns to Turramurra

Stand B:
575: Hornsby station via West Pymble, Pymble, Here, North Wahroonga & Hornsby Hospital

Stand C:
571: to South Turramurra Loop B (peak hours only)
572: to Macquarie University via South Turramurra

Stand D:
576T: weekday off peak to North Wahroonga Loop (Weekday peak hours only)
577: to North Turramurra Loop
577P: East Turramurra Loop (Weekday peak hours only)

Turramurra station is served by one NightRide route:
N90: Hornsby station to Town Hall station

References

External links

Turramurra station details Transport for New South Wales

Easy Access railway stations in Sydney
Railway stations in Sydney
Railway stations in Australia opened in 1890
Turramurra
North Shore railway line